Meadow Branch is a  tributary stream of Sleepy Creek in West Virginia's Eastern Panhandle region. It passes through the Sleepy Creek Wildlife Management Area, where it is dammed to form the  Sleepy Creek Lake.

Course
Meadow Branch's source lies between Sleepy Creek Mountain and Third Hill Mountain near Locks-of-the-Mountain in Berkeley County. Meadow Branch continues between the two mountains northward through the Sleepy Creek Wildlife Management Area where it joins Roaring Run. Meadow Branch is dammed to form Sleepy Creek Lake, a  impoundment. The stream flows into Morgan County where it meanders through the steep valley created at the northern ends of both Sleepy Creek and Third Hill Mountains. From the valley, Meadow Branch parallels West Virginia Route 9 and empties into Sleepy Creek in Spruce Pine Hollow.

See also
List of rivers of West Virginia

References

External links
Spruce Pine Hollow on the Washington Heritage Trail
West Virginia Rivers Coalition

Rivers of Berkeley County, West Virginia
Rivers of Morgan County, West Virginia
Tributaries of the Potomac River
Rivers of West Virginia